Piṇḍas are balls of cooked rice mixed with ghee and black sesame seeds offered to ancestors during Hindu funeral rites (Antyesti) and ancestor worship (Śrāddha). According to traditions in the Garuda Puran, offering a pinda to a recently departed soul helps to unite the soul with its ancestors. Pindas can be placed on a recently deceased person's hands and feet on their way to a funeral pyre. Pindas are offered to both maternal and paternal lineages. When making an offering of pindas the first can be offered to the father (or for widow's, their husband), the 2nd their father's father, the third their father's father's father, the 4th their mother, the 5th their father's mother, the 6th their father's mother's mother, and so on to cover ancestors from all sides of the family.

References

Death and Hinduism
Objects used in Hindu worship
Barley-based dishes
Food and drink in Hinduism